This is a list of Alpha Tau Omega brothers who have achieved notability.

Astronauts

Business
David Bohnett: USC; technology entrepreneur; co-founder of GeoCities
Paul Brown: Georgia Tech; CEO of Arby's
Walt Ehmer: Georgia Tech; CEO of Waffle House
Frank Fahrenkopf: Nevada-Reno '59; President and CEO of the American Gaming Association
Harold Allen Fernald: University of Maine 1954; Vice President CBS (retired)
Frank Fertitta III: USC '81; CEO of Station Casinos in Las Vegas, Nevada; owns UFC; co-owner of PRIDE FC Worldwide Holdings
Gerald J. Ford: Southern Methodist '66; CEO of Golden State Bancorp
Richard S. Fuld, Jr.: Colorado '69; CEO of Lehman Brothers Holdings
Richard C. Green: Southern Methodist '76; CEO of Aquila Corporation
Matthew J. Hart: Vanderbilt University '74; former President, COO, and CFO of Hilton Hotels
James P. Hoffa: Michigan State 1963; President of Teamsters Union; Jimmy Hoffa's son
J. Erik Jonsson: Rensselaer Polytechnic Institute; founder of Texas Instruments
Julius Curtis Lewis, Jr.: University of Georgia; President of J.C. Lewis Enterprises and Lewis Broadcasting Corp.
Billy Joe "Red" McCombs: University of Texas; former owner of Minnesota Vikings; namesake of McCombs School of Business
Gregory R. Page: University of North Dakota; President and CEO of Cargill, Inc.
Lewis E. Platt: Cornell 1965; former CEO of Hewlett-Packard
Bernard Ramsey: University of Georgia; philanthropist
Christopher A. Sinclair: University of Kansas '71; CEO of Mattel 
Elton B. Stephens: Birmingham-Southern; founder of EBSCO Industries
James E. Thompson: San Jose State University; founder, Chairman, and CEO of the Crown Worldwide Group
John A. Young: Oregon State University 1953; President and CEO of Hewlett-Packard (retired)

Education
Frank Hereford: former President of the University of Virginia
Stephen C. O'Connell: sixth President of the University of Florida (1967–1973)
Santa J. Ono: 28th president of University of Cincinnati; 15th president of University of Michigan
Blake R. Van Leer: fifth president of Georgia Institute of Technology, founder of Southern Polytechnic State University, former dean of University of Florida and North Carolina State University

Entertainment and media
John Besh: celebrity chef
Anthony Michael Brooks: world champion Rubik's Cube solver
Bugs Bunny: animated Warner Brothers character; initiated in 1947 at University of Kentucky; Warner Bros endorses Bugs as an actual member
Loring Buzzell: music publisher and record label executive
Dana Elcar: film and TV actor best known for his supporting role on MacGyver
Hunter Ellis: reality TV star; host of History Channel's Tactical to Practical
Rob Estes: actor, Melrose Place, Silk Stalkings, 90210
Guy Fieri: Food Network star; host of Guy's Big Bite and Diners, Drive-In's, and Dives; Nevada-Las Vegas
Brad Fiorenza: MTV's The Real World: San Diego cast member
Christopher Fitzgerald: Broadway and film actor
Shelby Foote: novelist and Civil War historian
Cork Graham: combat photographer imprisoned in Vietnam for illegally entering the country while looking for treasure buried by Captain Kidd
Bob Guiney: Bob the Bachelor from The Bachelor 4
Andrew Haug: Australian radio announcer; drummer for Contrive; considered by many to be the Howard Stern of Australia
Jack Ingram: country music performer
Anthony Jeselnik: standup-comedian, writer, and actor
Greg Kinnear: Talk Soup host; 1998 Academy Award nominee
Bert Kreischer: stand-up comedian, actor, and reality television host; known as "The Machine"
Art Linkletter: television personality; author, Kids Say The Darndest Things
Elmer Lower: former president of ABC News
Frank Marshall: film producer and director; co-founder of Amblin Entertainment
Garry Marshall: film director; Pretty Woman, Overboard), television producer (Happy Days and Laverne & Shirley; used ATO in the latter seasons of Happy Days several times, and an ATO fraternity paddle can be seen hanging on the wall of "Arnold's"
Jon Meacham: Editor of Newsweek; bestselling author; commentator on politics, history, and religious faith in America
Forrest Sawyer: ABC News, Nightline
Adam Schroeder: Warner Brothers and FOX New Regency movie producer; Chronicle, The Truman Show, Clueless
Elliot Segal: radio DJ and host of Elliot in the Morning
Grant Show: actor, Melrose Place
Stryker: radio DJ and co-host of the radio show Loveline
Tennessee Williams: Pulitzer Prize winner for A Streetcar Named Desire
Reynolds Wolf: CNN meteorologist

Legal 

Richard H. Bryan: former US Senator and Nevada Governor (Nevada-Reno); former Nevada Attorney General
Procter Ralph Hug, Jr.: Judge, Court of Appeals for the Ninth Circuit (Nevada-Reno)
William J. Raggio: Nevada State Senator (Nevada-Reno); former D.A. of Washoe County in Nevada (1958–1970)
Jim Santini: US Congressman, State of Nevada (Nevada-Reno); former Nevada district court judge
Grant Sawyer: Governor of Nevada, 1959-1967 (Nevada-Reno); co-founded Lionel Sawyer & Collins in 1967, which before its closing was the largest private law firm in Nevada
William L. Summers: criminal defense lawyer; past President of the National Association of Criminal Defense Lawyers; notable cases include Carrollton, Kentucky bus collision and New Mexico State Penitentiary riot
Michael Waddington: court martial defense lawyer; notable cases include Bagram torture and prisoner abuse scandal, the Iron Triangle murder case (William B. Hunsaker), the Maywand District killings, and the Mahmudiyah killings

Military
George S. Rentz: recipient of the Navy Cross
Holland Smith: Auburn University; General, USMC; the "father" of modern US amphibious warfare
Charles F. Wald: North Dakota State; General, USAF (retired); EUCOM Deputy Commander 2002-2006
Frank Bowman: Duke University; Four-Star Admiral, US Navy (retired); former Chief of Naval Personnel and former Director of Naval Nuclear Propulsion

Politics
Lee Atwater: Chair of the Republican National Committee
Birch Bayh: US Senator from Indiana (Purdue)
Richard H. Bryan: former US Senator and Nevada Governor (Nevada-Reno)
C. Farris Bryant: Governor of Florida 1961-1965; University of Florida
George C. Butte: jurist and Texas politician
Alberto "Al" Cardenas: political lobbyist; Florida Atlantic University
Lawton Chiles: US Senator; Governor of Florida 1991-1998; University of Florida
Nathan Deal: Governor of Georgia; Mercer University
Andrew Durham: Head of NASA Communications; President of Nigeria University of Kentucky in Lexington, Kentucky 
James Eastland: US Senator from 1942-1979; Senate Pro Tempore, 1972–1979
Frank Fahrenkopf: Chair of the Republican National Committee; president and CEO of the American Gaming Association (Nevada-Reno)
Sam Gibbons: Congressman
Matt Griffin: current Deputy Secretary of State of the State of Nevada (Nevada-Reno)
Stephen H. Grimes: Chief Justice of the Florida Supreme Court; University of Florida
Edward J. Gurney: US Senator, Florida
Lee H. Hamilton: US Congressman, Indiana
Spessard Holland: US Senator; Governor of Florida; University of Florida
Roy M. Huffington: Ambassador to Austria, 1990–93; named Ambassador of the Year in 1992 by the Diplomatic Club of Vienna
Procter Ralph Hug, Jr.: Judge, Court of Appeals for the Ninth Circuit (Nevada-Reno)
Willis B. Hunt Jr.: Chief Justice of the Supreme Court of Georgia; Emory University
Harry A. Johnston: US Congressman, Florida
Robert H. Johnson: state senator from Rock Springs, Wyoming; University of Wyoming
Kurt Kelly: State Representative dist. 24 Florida; Florida State University
Jack Kemp: 1996 candidate for US Vice President; former US Secretary of the Department of Housing and Urban Development (HUD)
Tom Kindness: US Congressman, Ohio; University of Maryland, College Park
Clarence D. Long: US Representative, 1963-1985
Mike Mansfield: US Senate Majority Leader, 1961-1977
Mel Martinez:  US Senator, Florida
Larry McDonald:  Georgia Congressman; killed on Korean Air Flight 007
Harry Mitchell:  US Congressman, Arizona
Stephen C. O'Connell: Justice and Chief Justice, Florida Supreme Court (1955–1967); President of the University of Florida (1967-1973)
John E. Porter: Congressman, Illinois
William J. Raggio: Nevada State Senator (Nevada-Reno)
Jim Santini: US Congressman, Nevada (Nevada-Reno)
Grant Sawyer: Governor of Nevada, 1959-1967 (Nevada-Reno)
Eric Simons: Jackson Township trustee
Alan K. Simpson: US Senator, Wyoming
Charles H. Smelser: former Maryland State Senator; University of Maryland, College Park
James C. Smith: former Florida Attorney General and Florida Secretary of State; Florida State University
J. Christopher Stevens: former US Ambassador to Libya (June - September 2012); killed in the U.S. Consulate attack in Benghazi
James Stockdale: 1992 Independent vice-presidential nominee
John S. Tanner: US Congressman from Tennessee; University of Tennessee

Religion
Hazen Graff Werner: bishop in the United Methodist Church from 1948 to 1968, Albion College

Science
Vannevar Bush: physicist; WWII advisor; architect of modern government science policy
Arthur Holly Compton: physicist and Nobel Prize winner
Karl Compton: physicist and influential science advisor in World War II; President of MIT
Ferid Murad: physician and pharmacologist; Nobel Prize in Physiology or Medicine 1998, for discovering the crucial role of nitric oxide in human physiology
Lester M. Moe: Photographer, engineer USNPS. Took many of the fire lookout panorama photos in the early 1930s. See the History of the Panoramic Lookout Project on the US National Park webpage.<https://www.nps.gov/articles/history-of-the-panoramic-lookout-project.htm>

Sports
John Ayers: NFL football player, 1977–1987
Dom Capers: defensive coordinator, Green Bay Packers; former NFL head coach
Chris Capuano: MLB pitcher, Los Angeles Dodgers
Bud Collins: tennis announcer, author
Cris Collinsworth: former NFL wide receiver, sports anchor
Lee Corso: sports commentator, football coach
Len Dawson: NFL Hall of Famer, Super Bowl IV MVP, sports anchor
Paul Dee: former University of Miami athletics director 
Ted DiBiase: "The Million Dollar Man"; former WWF wrestler
Terry Funk: pro wrestler
Mike Droese: "Duke The Dumpster"; former WWE wrestler
Joe Girardi: New York Yankees former manager and catcher; former Florida Marlins manager
Steve Gleason: NFL football player, 2000-2008
Lucas Glover: Clemson University; PGA Tour golfer; winner of the 2009 US Open
Curt Gowdy: sports broadcaster for five decades; seven Super Bowls and 14 World Series
Lou Groza: NFL Hall of Famer
Joe B. Hall: former head basketball coach of the University of Kentucky Wildcats (1978 National Champions)
Bill Ireland: University of Nevada; Las Vegas Baseball Coach 1960-1967; UNLV's first Athletic Director; the "father of UNLV athletics" (Nevada-Reno)
Keith Jackson: sports commentator, ABC
Tommy John: Major League baseball pitcher; four-time All Star team; initiated in 1964; Indiana State University
Ed Jucker: former head coach of the University of Cincinnati Bearcats basketball team; coached the team to two national championships in the 1960–61 and 1961-62 seasons
Ernie Koy Jr.: Texas Longhorns, 1963 National Champions; Pro Bowl running back for New York Giants
Joel McNulty: All Time Big Ten Conference men's track and field winner; two record-setting and one other win, 1952-1953
Magnum T. A.: "Terry Allen"; Former WWF pro wrestler
Curt Miller: head coach of the WNBA's Connecticut Sun
Jim Mora: former head coach of the New Orleans Saints
Victor Oladipo: NCAA 1st Team All-American for the Indiana Hoosiers
Rob Pannell: all-time NCAA Division 1 men's lacrosse scoring leader at Cornell University
Roger Reina: former UPenn wrestling coach
Brandon Slay:  gold medalist at Sydney Olympics in wrestling
Steve Spurrier: head coach of the University of South Carolina Gamecocks; Heisman Trophy winner 1966 at University of Florida; former Florida head coach; 1996 National Championship
Brad Stevens: Head Coach of the Boston Celtics; former Head Coach of Butler Bulldogs basketball team; DePauw University
Jason Szuminski: MLB baseball player (San Diego Padres) - 1st major league athlete drafted from MIT
Robby Thompson: second baseman for the San Francisco Giants, 1986-1996; winner of the Willie Mac Award in 1991
Jim Tressel:  former head coach of the Ohio State Buckeyes (2002 National Champions)
Matt Valenti: two-time NCAA national champion wrestler
Chandler Worthy: WR for the Houston Texans, 2015–present
Jack Youngblood: NFL Hall of Fame
Derek Miles

References

Alpha Tau Omega
brothers